Jagodnik transmitter (Polish: RTON Jagodnik) is an FM- and TV-broadcasting facility of TP Emitel near Jagonik, a part of Milejewo community, situated in Warmian-Masurian Voivodeship in Poland at . Jagodnik transmitter antenna uses a 115 metre tall lattice tower. Jagodnik transmitter is used for broadcasting the following programmes.

See also
List of towers
List of tallest structures in Poland

External links
http://emi.emitel.pl/EMITEL/obiekty.aspx?obiekt=DODR_N1D 
http://skyscraperpage.com/diagrams/?b60903
http://radiopolska.pl/wykaz/pokaz_lokalizacja.php?pid=77

Towers in Poland
Elbląg County
Buildings and structures in Warmian-Masurian Voivodeship